Cornelius Sacket House is a historic home located at Cape Vincent in Jefferson County, New York.  It was built about 1900 and is a -story Dutch Colonial Revival–style residence with a gambrel roof and clapboard siding.  It features a 1-story open porch with five fluted Ionic columns.  Also on the property is a boathouse and formal sunken garden.

It was listed on the National Register of Historic Places in 1985.

References

Houses on the National Register of Historic Places in New York (state)
Colonial Revival architecture in New York (state)
Houses completed in 1900
Houses in Jefferson County, New York
National Register of Historic Places in Jefferson County, New York